Raymond Bonner (born October 14, 1950) is an American football coach and former player. He served as the head football coach at Alabama A&M University, first as an interim coach in 1991 and then as a full-time head coach from 1992 to 1993, compiling a record of 9–17–1. Bonner was selected by the Detroit Lions in the 1973 NFL Draft.

Head coaching record

College football

Notes

References

1950 births
Living people
American football defensive backs
Alabama A&M Bulldogs football coaches
Middle Tennessee Blue Raiders football coaches
Middle Tennessee Blue Raiders football players
Texas Southern Tigers football coaches
College track and field coaches in the United States
High school football coaches in Georgia (U.S. state)
People from Franklin County, Tennessee
Coaches of American football from Tennessee
Players of American football from Tennessee
African-American coaches of American football
African-American players of American football
African-American basketball coaches
20th-century African-American sportspeople
21st-century African-American sportspeople